Pod or POD may refer to:

Biology 
 Pod (fruit), a type of fruit of a flowering plant
 Husk or pod of a legume
 Pod of whales or other marine mammals
 "-pod", a suffix meaning "foot" used in taxonomy

Electronics and computing 
 Proper orthogonal decomposition in the field of numerical simulation 
Plain old data in computing, data distinct from an object
 Plain Old Documentation, a documentation tool for the computer language Perl
 Point of delivery (networking)
 Pseudo open drain, an electronics interface technology
 Personal online data stores, storage of personal data for the web decentralization project Solid 
 Pod, the basic scheduling unit in Kubernetes

Film and television
 Pod (film), an American horror film
 Podracer, a type of vehicle from the Star Wars universe
 Orthotube or pod, a fictional security device in Spooks
 Pod, the growth medium for the replacements in Invasion of the Body Snatchers
 Pod, a fictional organic gaming console featured in existenz
 Personal Overhaul Device on Snog Marry Avoid?

Music 
 P.O.D., an American metal band from San Diego, California
 Pod (Afro Celt Sound System album) (2004)
 Pod (The Breeders album) (1990)
 The Pod, a 1991 album by Ween
 Pod (amp modeler), a line of guitar amp modelers by Line 6
 "POD" (song), a 2006 song by Tenacious D from The Pick of Destiny
 "10 Ribs & All/Carrot Pod Pod" or "Pod", a 2015 song on the deluxe edition of Presence by Led Zeppelin

Transportation
 Gun pod, a detachable weapons pack
 Targeting pod, a target designation tool used by ground-attack aircraft
 Pod (vehicle), in the proposed ULTra personal rapid transit system
 Engine pod or nacelle, a streamlined aircraft engine enclosure
 Escape pod, a small capsule to escape a vessel in an emergency
 Pod propulsion, ship propulsion method also known as an azimuth thruster
 POD, an abbreviation for port of discharge

Other uses
 Pod (caste) (Poundra), a scheduled caste in India
 Pod (Pokémon) or Chili
 Pod (sculpture), a sculpture by Pete Beeman
 POD (video game)
 Podcast, a form of digital media
 Pod Children's Charity, an English charity
 Coffee pod, ground coffee in a filter container
 Pod hotel, cheap accommodation with very small rooms
 Laundry detergent pod
 Peace One Day, a non-profit organisation
 Point of difference between products
 Point of divergence of an alternate history from actual history
 Print on demand or publishing on demand
 Proof of delivery of an item
 Protective Oceanic Device, an electronic shark repellent
 Power on demand energy supply,
 Pod, a format used by Current TV
 Probability of detection, a nondestructive testing term
 Proper Orthogonal Decomposition or principal components analysis, in statistics
 POD, an acronym for postoperative delirium
 Sarco pod, a euthanasia device

See also 
 iPod, a portable media player designed by Apple Inc.
 PODS (disambiguation)
 PPOD (disambiguation)